KDUX may refer to:

 KDUX-FM, a radio station (104.7 FM) licensed to Aberdeen, Washington, United States
 Moore County Airport (Texas) (ICAO code KDUX) in Moore County, Texas